María José Alcalá Izguerra (born 24 December 1971) is a Mexican former diver. She competed at the 1988, 1992, 1996 and the 2000 Summer Olympics. In 2021, she became the first female President of the Mexican Olympic Committee.

References

External links
 

1971 births
Living people
Mexican female divers
Olympic divers of Mexico
Divers at the 1988 Summer Olympics
Divers at the 1992 Summer Olympics
Divers at the 1996 Summer Olympics
Divers at the 2000 Summer Olympics
Divers from Mexico City
Pan American Games medalists in diving
Pan American Games bronze medalists for Mexico
Divers at the 1999 Pan American Games
Medalists at the 1999 Pan American Games
20th-century Mexican women
21st-century Mexican women